William Ward Watkin (January 21, 1886 – June 24, 1952) was an architect primarily practicing in Houston, Texas. He was the founder of the Architecture Department of Rice University in 1912, and remained on the Rice faculty until his death. Concurrently, he also designed a number of important projects, mostly in the Houston area.

Watkin was born in Boston, Massachusetts on January 21, 1886, and grew up in Danville, Pennsylvania, where he graduated from high school in 1903.  After graduating from the University of Pennsylvania in 1908, he spent a year in Europe and then moved to Boston, Massachusetts to join the architecture firm of Cram, Goodhue & Ferguson.  Watkin was then sent to Houston, TX to work on plans for Rice Institute (now named Rice University) and was the firm's representative supervisor there.  Edgar Odell Lovett, the President of Rice Institute, offered Watkin a faculty position in architectural engineering when the Institute opened in 1912.  He later became the head of the architecture department, a position he held until his death.

In addition to his duties at Rice, Watkin designed a large number of structures, many of which are architecturally significant. He died and was interred at Forest Park Cemetery  in Houston .

Early life
William Ward Watkin's parents were Fred Ward and Mary Mathilda (née Hancock) Watkin. The family moved to Danville, Pennsylvania, where young William graduated from Danville High School in 1903. He entered the University of Pennsylvania, where he studied architecture with Paul Philippe Cret and earned a B.S. degree in architecture in 1908. In 1909, he joined the Boston architectural firm of Cram, Goodhue, and Ferguson. In 1910, the firm sent him to Houston, Texas to supervise construction of the newly created Rice Institute (now Rice University).

Watkin married Annie Ray Townsend in 1914. They had three children, two daughters and a son: Annie Ray Watkin (1914-2011), Rosemary Watkin (1917-1984) and William Ward Watkin, Jr. (1919-2001). His first wife died in 1928. His second wife was Josephine Cockerel, who died in 1987.

Career
Watkin's first major assignment was to oversee construction of a new school in Houston, Texas named the William Marsh Rice Institute. Watkin had helped prepare the original masterplan drawings following intense correspondence between Cram, Goodhue, and President Lovett. The initial complement of structures included the Administration Building (now named Lovett Hall), a power plant and Mechanical Laboratory, and one dormitory with a dining hall, located on  two miles southwest of downtown on an unpaved Main Street. The cornerstone of the Administration Building was laid in 1911.

Academic career
After the school opened in 1912, Watkin was hired by Dr. Edgar Odell Lovett, the president of Rice, to become an instructor in architectural engineering. He was promoted to assistant professor in 1915 and full professor in 1922. In this capacity, he would continue to work on newer buildings for the campus and nearby, such as:
 Autry House (1920), the unofficial student center across Main Street
 Rice Fieldhouse (1920)
 Harry Crothers Wiess House (1920), later purchased by Rice and used as the President's House.
 Chemistry Building (1925), later renamed Keck Hall
 Robert and Agnes Cohen House (1927), which houses the faculty club.

In 1927, he became a full professor and maintained that rank until his death in 1952.

Watkins established a traveling architectural fellowship in 1928, which enabled one student per year to travel abroad while studying architecture. The fellowship was renamed for its founder in 1953 and is now the William Ward Watkin Traveling Fellowship.

Commercial practice
Watkin also conducted a commercial architectural practice in parallel with his academic position. This enabled him to participate in creating a number of notable projects. Most were built in the Houston area, but a few were outside the area. For example, he designed the campus of Texas Tech University and its administration building in Lubbock, Texas.

Other significant projects
 Miller Outdoor Theater - The original structure was designed by Watkin in 1922, located in Houston's Hermann Park;
 Houston Public Library - Watkins designed the former main building, which opened in downtown Houston in 1926, and was later renamed the Julia Ideson Building. This building is still in use by the public.
 Museum of Fine Arts, Houston - The original MFAH structure was designed by Watkin in the early 1920s and opened to the public in 1924. Other architects have expanded the building, which has been renamed as the Caroline Wiess Law Building.
 Ritz Theater, Houston - The only theater designed by William Ward Watkin and important as Houston’s only surviving example of a historic movie palace. Built in 1926 in the neoclassical architectural style. Part of the Main Street/Market Square Historic District listed on the National Register of Historic Places. Saved from demolition in 1990 thru adaptive reuse as a private special events facility it is renamed The Majestic Metro.

External links
Guide to the William Ward Watkin papers, 1903-1956, Woodson Research Center, Rice University
William Ward Watkin architectural records, 1903-1956, Rice Digital Scholarship Archive
Guide to the Watkin family papers, 1899-1999, Woodson Research Center, Rice University

References

1886 births
1952 deaths
20th-century American architects
Architecture educators
University of Pennsylvania alumni
People from Boston
People from Danville, Pennsylvania
People from Houston
Architects from Houston
Rice University faculty